Nadikudi–Macherla branch line connects  and Macherla of Guntur district in the Indian state of Andhra Pradesh. It is one of the seven sections under the administration of Guntur railway division of South Central Railway zone. Further this line connects with Nallapadu–Pagidipalli section. The branch line is an electrified single-track railway.

Jurisdiction 

References 

Rail transport in Andhra Pradesh

5 ft 6 in gauge railways in India
Transport in Guntur district